Coleman Barrett (born 10 November 1982), nicknamed Coley, is an Irish professional boxer who has held the Irish heavyweight title.

Prizefighter 
Coleman competed in the Prizefighter series on 2 October 2009 at the ExCeL London, London Docklands, London. He made his way to the final as a 25/1 outsider, beating Scott Gammer and Carl Baker, losing to Audley Harrison by TKO in round 2 of 3. Barrett recently won the Irish heavyweight title against Colin Kenna.

Prizefighter summary

External links 

Living people
1982 births
People from Galway (city)
People from County Galway
Heavyweight boxers
Prizefighter contestants
Irish male boxers